George John McCart (24 June 1883 – 8 November 1931) was a former Australian rules footballer who played with Carlton, Melbourne and St Kilda in the Victorian Football League (VFL).

He died on 8 November 1931.

Notes

External links 

George McCart's playing statistics from VFA Project
George McCart's profile at Blueseum

Obituary – Herald
Demonwiki profile

1883 births
1931 deaths
Australian rules footballers from Melbourne
Carlton Football Club players
Melbourne Football Club players
St Kilda Football Club players
West Melbourne Football Club players
Essendon Association Football Club players
People from Dandenong, Victoria